Alaa Murabit M.D. (born 26 October 1989) is a Libyan-Canadian physician, Meritorious Service Cross recipient, one of 17 Global Sustainable Development Goals Advocates appointed by the Secretary-General of the United Nations, and a UN High-Level Commissioner on Health Employment and Economic growth. In 2019 Murabit was selected as one of the Top 20 of the World's 100 Most Influential People in Gender Policy alongside Ruth Bader Ginsburg, Melinda Gates, and Michelle Obama. Murabit is the co-founder of The Omnis Institute, an independent non-profit organization that aims to work on critical global issues through the empowerment of emerging local leaders. She previously founded and spearheaded Voice of Libyan Women at the age of 21.

Her TED Talk, released in July 2015, "What my religion really says about women" has been viewed over nine million times on TED.com and YouTube combined, was selected as the TED Talk of the Day and one of four moving TED Talks you should watch right now by The New York Times and one of 12 TED Talks That Define the Future of Feminism 

She is a Forbes 30 Under 30, a UCD James Joyce Award recipient, one of Canada's 100 most impactful women in history, and Nobel Peace Prize nominee. Her leadership in global policy and security was recognized by Harvard Law who named her the youngest 2017 Woman Inspiring Change.  She has previously been named the Marisa Bellisario International Humanitarian by the Italian Government, the 2014 International TrustWomen Hero by The New York Times, one of 25 women under 25 to watch by Newsweek, a 100 Top Woman by the BBC and the SAFE Global Hero.

Murabit received her Medical Doctorate from Al Zawiya University in 2013 and a Masters in International Strategy and Diplomacy with Distinction from the London School of Economics in 2016.

Early life and education
Murabit was born and raised in Saskatoon, Saskatchewan, Canada, the sixth of eleven children in her family. Her father is a doctor. She has stated that, although she initially had no plans on advocating women's rights, her parents' equal treatment of her and her brothers played an extremely important role in the way she viewed the world, "I know I have a duty to every child to recognize and cultivate their own sense of leadership, because had it not been for my mother, I would not have recognized or claimed my own space to lead."

After completing high school at age fifteen, she moved with members of her family to Zawiya, Libya in 2005.

She studied at the College of Medicine at Al Zawiya University in Libya from 2006 to 2013, and worked at Zawiya Teaching Hospital and at various makeshift clinics during the 2011 civil war. When the war began, her father became involved almost immediately with the rebels, providing medical care for rebel soldiers, appearing in SkyNews footage with Alex Crawford under the name "Dr. M", creating insecurity for her family.

Murabit received her Doctor of Medicine from Al Zawiya University in 2013. She went on to receive a master's degree in International Strategy and Diplomacy with Distinction from the London School of Economics in 2016 with research focused on inclusive security and securitization.

Career

2011–2015: VLW, Women, Peace and Security, United Nations

Murabit founded Voice of Libyan Women in August 2011 and acted as president until 2015. VLW was founded following the 2011 Libyan Revolution while in her final year of medical school." The organization pushes for inclusive peace processes and conflict mediation by shifting the paradigm of women's role in society at both the grassroots and policy level and is best known for researching women's security, advocating against gender violence, training women to participate in government and ensure women are recognized in national policies.

VLW's Noor Campaign was the focus of Murabit's 2015 TED talk. The campaign aimed to challenge the misrepresentation and misuse of religion to negate women's rights. The Noor Campaign is based on community leaders and "brought together over 600 local community leaders, including those who had never worked in civil society before". Working with a network of hundreds of community organizations throughout Libya, including Ayadina Charity in Benghazi, Mothers for Martyrs and The Southern Women's Forum, the campaign reached over 35 cities and communities, as far south as Ghat, Libya on the southern Libyan border, Tobruk and Bayda on the Eastern border and Nalut and Ghadames in the west. The campaign and methodology were later replicated internationally.

In 2013, she spoke at the Women in the World summit. "During the revolution, I saw phenomenally brave women taking a leading role," Murabit told Lesley Stahl. "Often when violence happens, people excuse it with religion," Murabit said. "Young girls need to know that they can fight fire with fire and say, 'No, my religion is not why you are doing this.'"

She has maintained that peace is only achievable through communities, "The only real solution, the only way to get that grenade or gun put down safely is by filling his hands and head with something else. A pencil, a paycheck, a diploma, a dream – by building up people, by creating institutions we break down wars. By strengthening local peacebuilders we give them the tools to change their communities from within."

In July 2014 Murabit was appointed a member of the United Nations 1325 Advisory Board, which monitors the implementation of United Nations Security Council Resolution 1325 on women, peace, and security. She has been an Ashoka Fellow since September 2014 and has been an Advisor to UN Women Global Civil Society Advisory Group since October 2014. She is also a founding coalition member of Harvard University's "Everywoman, Everywhere" initiative.

2015–present: Omnis Institute, Emerging Leaders Lab, UN

In May 2015, Murabit addressed an official TED audience, released in July 2015 as an official "Ted Talk of the Day". The New York Times selected it as one of "4 moving TED Talks you should watch right now."

In October 2015, Murabit was selected as the Civil Society Speaker for the 15th Anniversary Open Debate of United Nations Security Council Resolution 1325 and in January 2016 she became the youngest appointee of 17 United Nations Sustainable Development Goals Global Advocates and later that year she was named a UN High-Level Commissioner on Health Employment and Economic Growth.

In 2016, she founded a global Mentorship Programme for emerging leaders and co-founded The Omnis Institute. In 2017 she became an International Deliver for Good Influencer. She is a board member of International Alert, Keeping Children Safe, Malaria No More, and the Malala Fund and was named a member of the Helena Group. She was renamed a UN Sustainable Development Goal Advocate in 2019 by UN Secretary-General António Guterres.

Murabit has spoken at leading international conferences including TED, World Economic Forum, WIRED, Munich Security Conference and Hilton Foundation Symposium.

Honours and awards

Murabit has received the following national and international honors (awards and nominations):
 2012: The New York Times and Thomson Reuters "TrustWomen Hero Award" finalist 
 2012: Institute for Inclusive Security Women Waging Peace Inductee 
 2013: Newsweek "One of 25 women under 25 to watch in 2013."
 2013: Marisa Bellisario International Humanitarian Award from the President of the Italian Republic.
 2013: The New York Times and Thomson Reuters TrustWomen Hero Award Winner 
 2014: UN Women Global Advisor 
 2014: Safe Magazine "Global Hero" and cover person.
 2014: Ashoka Fellow.
 2014: BBC Top 100 Woman 
 2015: TED Talk of the Day 
 2015: Selected to Address UN Security Council on 15th anniversary of United Nations Security Council Resolution 1325
 2015: Helena Group Inductee 
 2016: MIT Media Lab Director's Fellow 
 2016: Appointed as a United Nations High-Level Commissioner on Health Employment and Economic Growth 
 2016: Appointed as one of 17 United Nations Global Sustainable Development Goal Advocates by the UN Secretary-General alongside Messi, Erna Solberg, Jeffrey Sachs and others 
 2017: Maastricht University Opening Academic Year Honoree 
 2017: Aspen Institute Aspen Health Scholar 
 2017: Women Deliver Named a Deliver For Good Global Influencer alongside José Mujica, Phumzile Mlambo-Ngcuka, Sophie Grégoire Trudeau
 2017: LinkedIn: Leader
 2017: Bay St. Bull: Canada's 30x30 
 2017: Harvard Law Youngest "Woman Inspiring Change"
 2017: Forbes 30 Under 30
 2017: 2017 Nobel Peace Prize Nominee by the Ministry for Foreign Affairs (Sweden)
 2018: Global Citizen Award 
 2018: SheKnows MediaBlogHer Global Citizen Voice of the Year 
 2018: One of Canada's 100 "Women of Impact" in History selected by the Government of Canada, Status of Women
 2018: Top 25 Women of Influence in Canada 
 2018: Nelson Mandela Foundation Nelson Mandela Changemaker Award recipient (awarded by the Mandela Family) 
 2018: Canadian Meritorious Service Cross recipient (the first Civilian recipient from Saskatchewan) 
 2019: WIRED World Global Thought leader 
 2019: Wonder Women: 3 Canadians Championing Female Empowerment On the Global Stage 
 2019: UCD James Joyce Award Recipient 
 2019: Named One of the World's Top 20 Most Influential People in Gender Policy alongside Ruth Bader Ginsburg, Melinda Gates and Michelle Obama.
 2020: Harvard Kennedy School Gleitsman International Award Nominee
 2020: "One of Canada's nine Trailblazers" by the Government of Canada

Publications
Murabit has written articles for The Boston Globe, Wired, the Carter Center, NewAmerica, Chime for Change, Huffington Post, The Christian Science Monitor and Impakter. She is a contributing writer for the bestselling feminist anthology Feminists Don't Wear Pink (and other lies).

See also
 List of peace activists

References

External links
 
 Alaa Murabit (NGO Voice of Libyan Women) on Women, Peace and Security – Security Council, 7533rd meeting

1989 births
Living people
Canadian women's rights activists
People from Saskatoon
BBC 100 Women
Canadian Muslims
MIT Media Lab people
Canadian motivational writers
Women motivational writers
21st-century Canadian physicians
Canadian women non-fiction writers
21st-century Canadian non-fiction writers
21st-century Canadian women writers
Canadian people of Libyan descent
Canadian emigrants to Libya
Alumni of the London School of Economics
Ashoka Fellows